The Yogacintamani is an early 17th-century hatha yoga text, covering the eight auxiliaries of yoga. The asana section in all the manuscripts describes 34 asanas, while variations in some manuscripts add another 84, mentioning most of the non-standing asanas used in modern postural yoga.

Text 

The Yogacintamani (IAST:) is an early 17th-century hatha yoga text, its eight sections covering the eight auxiliaries of yoga. The text quotes the Hatha Yoga Pradipika extensively. The text is known from multiple manuscripts.

The asana section in all the manuscripts of the Yogacintamani describes 34 asanas including kukkutasana, mayurasana, and siddhasana, while variations in some manuscripts add another 84, mentioning most of the non-standing asanas used in modern postural yoga, including forward bends like paschimottanasana, backbends such as ustrasana, twists like matsyendrasana, and arm balances like kukkutasana. 

Kukkutasana is described in the same way as in the Vasishtha Samhita and the Hatha Yoga Pradipika, but in the Ujjain manuscript someone in the second half of the 17th century has added a note that the pose "is effective for cleaning the channels"; this is a benefit ascribed to siddhasana in the Hatha Yoga Pradipika. The yoga scholar Jason Birch comments that the manuscript shows that yogis at that time were "willing to combine yoga techniques from Śaiva and
Vaiṣṇava traditions".

References 

Hatha yoga texts